Lauren Hill (October 1, 1995 – April 10, 2015) was an American freshman basketball player at Mount St. Joseph University in Cincinnati, who suffered from terminal brain cancer. She was runner up for 2014 Associated Press Female Athlete of the Year, coming second in voting to Mo'ne Davis.

Biography
Lauren Hill was born in Greendale, Indiana. Her battle with cancer became public when the NCAA agreed to allow Mount St. Joseph to play Hiram College on November 2, 2014, thirteen days prior to the original game date of November 15, 2014, so Hill could play. The location of the game was also originally moved from Hiram's Price Gymnasium to Mount St. Joseph's Harrington Center so that Hill would not have to travel the over 300 miles from Cincinnati to Hiram. However, due to public interest in the game, it was later moved from the 2,000 seat Harrington Center to the 10,250 seat Cintas Center on the campus of Xavier University.  She raised US$1 million for pediatric cancer research with a Cincinnati telethon for The Cure Starts Now Foundation. The Foundation then donated $1 million to brain cancer research and continues to grow and donated over $4.7 million to medical research in 2015.

Hill's family signed her up for hospice care on December 1, 2014.

After Hill played in four games and made five layups, Mount St. Joseph basketball coach Dan Benjamin announced that she would not play in future games but would like to stay on as an honorary coach. On January 7, 2015, Hill served as an assistant coach for the team.

Wheaties honored Hill with her picture on its cereal box.

On February 6, 2015, Hill was given an honorary Doctorate of Humane Letters degree by Mount St. Joseph University.

On March 4, 2015, she was named to the all-conference first team in the Heartland Collegiate Athletic Conference. "This award is being presented to Lauren in recognition of her courage and outstanding leadership", said conference commissioner Chris Ragsdale.

On April 5, 2015, she was given the Pat Summitt Courage Award.

Death
Hill died on April 10, 2015 at Cincinnati Children's Hospital Medical Center. A public visitation and memorial service was held on April 13, 2015 at the Cintas Center with a private funeral and burial on April 15, 2015.

Legacy
In June 2015, Hill was honored with a brick in the courtyard of the Indiana Basketball Hall of Fame; the brick is inscribed with her name and the word "Hero".

On July 15, 2015, Hill was honored with the "Best Moment" Award at the annual 2015 ESPY Awards. Her parents, Brent and Lisa Hill, accepted the award on her behalf.

On June 11, 2016, Hill received the first "For the Love of the Game" award presented by the Women's Basketball Hall of Fame.  This award is presented for showing outstanding courage and inspiration.  Her college coach at Mount St. Josephs, Dan Benjamin received the award during the WBHOF Induction Ceremony in Knoxville, TN.

See also
2014 Hiram vs. Mount St. Joseph women's basketball game featuring Lauren Hill

References

1995 births
2015 deaths
People from Lawrenceburg, Indiana
Sportspeople from the Cincinnati metropolitan area
Basketball players from Indiana
American women's basketball players
Forwards (basketball)
Mount St. Joseph Lions women's basketball players
Mount St. Joseph University alumni
Deaths from brain cancer in the United States
Deaths from cancer in Ohio
Neurological disease deaths in Ohio